The National Center for Digitization (NCD) is a consortium composed of the most important
leading Serbian (and former Yugoslav) cultural and scientific institutions, which analyse problems of digitization of cultural and scientific heritage.

History 
The work on the foundation of the National Center for Digitization (NCD) in Serbia started in 2002, with the idea to form a consortium consisting of leading cultural and research institutions involved in digitization of heritage. At the present state, the consortium includes: 

 Mathematical institute of the Serbian Academy of Sciences and Arts
 Faculty of Mathematics Belgrade
 National Library of Serbia
 National Museum Belgrade
 Archaeological Institute Belgrade
 Archive of the Republic of Serbia
 Institute for the Protection of Cultural Monuments of Serbia
 Yugoslav Film Archive
 University library Svetozar Markovic

Objectives 
 
The main subjects of cooperation in the NCD are the following:

 Coordination of efforts of institutions involved in the cultural and scientific heritage digitization
 Establishing and promoting a national strategy for the cultural and scientific heritage digitization
 Exploring, adaptation and implementation of international standards and protocols for the cultural and scientific heritage digitization and preservation at the national level. Development of new standards in areas where they do not exist.
 Launching the cultural and scientific heritage digitization and making plans for possible migration process to new formats and technologies for already digitized data

The main activities of the NCD are:

 Annual national conferences New Technologies and Standards:Digitization of National Heritage
 The journal Review of the National Center for Digitization, published both on paper and in electronic form
 Establishing, at the national level, proposals for a basic set of standards in the area of digitization of cultural and scientific heritage
 Developing models of the appropriate distributed information systems and specific software for the realization of the digitization standards
 Collaboration with the similar institutions from abroad, particularly with the South-Eastern European Digitization Initiative (SEEDI).

Projects 
 
Electronic catalog of cultural monuments in Serbia
Electronic editions of mathematical journals
Digital library retro-digitized books and documents
Digital National library of Serbia

See also 
 
South-Eastern European Digitization Initiative (SEEDI)

References

Bibliography 

 National Center for Digitization, NCD <http://www.ncd.org.rs/ncd_en/index.html> (May 24th, 2011)
 National conferences New Technologies and Standards: Digitization of National Heritage <http://www.ncd.org.rs/ncd_en/conferences.html> (May 24th, 2011)
 Review of the National Center for Digitization <http://elib.mi.sanu.ac.rs/pages/browse_publication.php?db=ncd> (May 24th, 2011)

2002 establishments in Serbia
Cultural organizations based in Serbia
Data transmission
Digital preservation
Mass digitization
Technology consortia